"The Boomin' System" is the first single released from LL Cool J's fourth album, Mama Said Knock You Out. Produced by Marley Marl and co-produced by LL Cool J., it was released on August 2, 1990, by Def Jam Recordings. It was the first of the six singles released from the album and reached No. 48 on the Billboard Hot 100 and No. 1 on the Hot Rap Singles chart. The song samples "The Payback" and "Funky Drummer" by James Brown and "Bring the Noise" by Public Enemy.

The single is the only way to obtain the original uncensored version of the song, as all album issues have the track with two lines ("Pass the Heineken" and "Roll up a fat one") edited out.

Track listing

A-side
"The Boomin' System" (Radio 1) - 3:41
"The Boomin' System" (Radio 2) - 3:41

B-side
"The Boomin' System" (The Underground Mix) - 4:31

References

1990 singles
LL Cool J songs
Songs written by LL Cool J
1990 songs
Def Jam Recordings singles
Song recordings produced by Marley Marl